One Good Well is the seventeenth studio album by American country music artist Don Williams. It was released on April 28, 1989 via RCA Records. The album includes the singles "One Good Well", "I've Been Loved by the Best", "Just as Long as I Have You" and "Maybe That's All It Takes".

Track listing

Chart performance

References

1989 albums
Don Williams albums
Albums produced by Garth Fundis
RCA Records albums